Bombardopolis is a commune located in the hilly country of the Môle-Saint-Nicolas Arrondissement, in the Nord-Ouest department of Haiti.

History 
Bombardopolis was founded in 1764 by German settlers with the support of the nearby Director of Môle, Mr. Fusée Aublet. A population of French Acadians and Germans who had been living in Louisiana had arrived in Môle-Saint-Nicolas; and the local government wished to separate those of German ancestry from the Acadians, judging the two cultures could not happily coexist. The new community was named after Fusée Aublet's German benefactor, Mr. de Bombarde, a wealthy financier and amateur naturalist.

During the colonial period, Bombardopolis was first a parish under the administration of the Quartier du Môle-Saint-Nicolas, and then was elevated to canton status in 1797. Bombardopolis was made a commune of the Republic of Haiti in 1821, during the administration of President Jean-Pierre Boyer.

Economy 
The local economy is mainly based on the production of charcoal, goat farming and fishing.

Demography 
The commune had an estimated adult population of 36,028 for the year 2015.

The commune had an enumerated population of 27,360 for the year 2003.

Communal Sections 
Bombardopolis is subdivided into three communal sections, namely:
 Plate-Forme (contains the municipality of Bombardopolis)
 Des Forges
 Plaine-d'Oranges

References

Populated places in Nord-Ouest (department)
Communes of Haiti